"Take Your Time" is a song by American Southern rock band Lynyrd Skynyrd. It was recorded in early 1973 at Studio One, Doraville, Georgia, and was the B-side to the "Sweet Home Alabama" and the "Don't Ask Me No Questions singles.
However, it was not featured on any album until the compilation album Legend in 1987. It is also featured on the 1997 re-release of Second Helping with bonus tracks. It was written by Ronnie Van Zant and Ed King.

Personnel
Lynyrd Skynyrd
Ronnie Van Zant - lead vocals
Gary Rossington - guitar
Allen Collins  - bass
Ed King - slide guitar
Billy Powell - Piano
Bob Burns - drums and percussion

References

1974 songs
Lynyrd Skynyrd songs
Song recordings produced by Al Kooper
Songs written by Ed King
Songs written by Ronnie Van Zant